is a Japanese economist and politician.  She is a professor at the Institute of Advanced Studies on Asia at the University of Tokyo. Yasutomi came out as a transgender woman in 2014.

Education 
Yasutomi graduated from Kyoto University in 1991 with a degree in economics and continued to graduate with a PhD in 1997 on the financial history of Manchuria.

Career 
Yasutomi's first tenured post was as a Visiting Research Associate at the London School of Economics, 1996–7. In 1997 Yasutomi was employed as Assistant Professor at Nagoya University until moving to the University of Tokyo in 2000. In 2009, Yasutomi was promoted to Professor, after holding several assistant professor roles within the university.

She is a specialist in the economics of Manchuria, whose research received a Nikkei Economics Culture Award. Other research interests include the socio-ecology of East Asia, theoretical economics, population dynamics, harassment theory, Peter Drucker and the thoughts of Confucius.

Politics 
In July 2018 Yasutomi ran as a candidate in the mayoral elections for Higashimatsuyama, near Tokyo. She lost to the current candidate Koichi Morita by a margin of 12,000 votes. In Yasutomi's campaign agenda, her main priority was a focus on bringing an end to child abuse. In 2019, Yasutomi was one of ten candidates from the new Reiwa Shinsengumi party to stand for election to the House of Councillors.

The film Reiwa Uprising was made about Yasutomi's attempt to be elected and was screened at the Tokyo Film Festival in 2019.

See also
 List of transgender people
 Deirdre McCloskey

References 

Living people
1963 births
21st-century Japanese women politicians
21st-century Japanese politicians
Transgender politicians
Transgender women
Japanese LGBT politicians
Japanese women economists
Academic staff of the University of Tokyo
Transgender academics
21st-century Japanese LGBT people